Mehrdad Mohammad-Hosseini (February 8, 1989) is an Iranian football goalkeeper, who currently plays for Esteghlal in Iran Pro League.

Honours

Club
Esteghlal
Iran Pro League (1): 2012–13
Runner up (1): 2010–11
Hazfi Cup (1): 2011–12

References

External links
 Mehrdad Hosseini at Persian League
 

Iranian footballers
Living people
Esteghlal F.C. players
1989 births
Association football goalkeepers